Crosby Stuart Noyes (February 16, 1825 – February 21, 1908) was the publisher of the Washington Evening Star.

Biography
Noyes was born on February 16, 1825, in Minot, Maine, USA, and is most known for publishing the Washington Evening Star. He was interested in writing from childhood, publishing his own juvenile newspaper called the Minot Notion when he was fifteen. Maine newspapers later began to print humorous sketches that he had written. One such sketch, a dialect-heavy piece titled "A Yankee in a Cotton Factory" was widely republished.

Having arranged to write letters from Washington for several New England newspapers, he traveled to Washington, D.C., in 1847. His funds running low and unable to afford train fare, he had to walk from Baltimore to Washington. In 1855, he traveled around Europe on foot and during that time contributed letters to the Boston Transcript.

For several months, Noyes worked for a bookseller, as an usher in a theatre, and as a route agent for The Baltimore Sun before becoming a writer for a local weekly, the Washington News. He also began writing reports in the form of letters for newspapers in Maine, Boston, and Philadelphia, and became part of the press gallery that covered the United States Congress.

In 1855, Noyes returned to Washington and became a reporter for the three-year-old Evening Star. It was managed by William Douglas Wallach. Circulation increased in the decade before the American Civil War and Noyes developed contacts with the Lincoln administration's cabinet such that the Star became an outlet for official announcements. He eventually rose to the position of assistant editor. In 1867, he became editor-in-chief after Wallach sold the paper to Noyes and two other investors for $110,000($ today).

After the Civil War, Noyes and his newspaper crusaded to improve Washington's buildings and infrastructure, encouraging the efforts of Alexander Robey Shepherd. In 1863, he served on the city council and for a couple of terms as an alderman. He was active in the establishment of Rock Creek Park.

He married Elizabeth S. Williams in 1856. They had three sons, Theodore Williams, Frank Brett and Thomas Clarence, and at least one daughter. Theodore was an associate editor at the Evening Star and Frank was the treasurer and business manager.

In 1893, Noyes and Brainard Warner, an early developer of Kensington, Maryland, built and stocked what became the first public library in the D.C. area, now known as the Noyes Children's Library in Kensington.

He died on February 21, 1908, in Pasadena, California.

Crosby S. Noyes Education Campus, a public school in Washington, D.C., was named in his honor. Two residential streets — Noyes Drive and Crosby Road — carry his name in the Woodside Park neighborhood of Silver Spring, Maryland. The entire neighborhood was developed from his country estate, known as Alton Farm. Mount Noyes in Washington state is named in his honor.

References

External links

 Men of Mark in America Biography & Portrait
 

Noyes family
1825 births
1908 deaths
American newspaper publishers (people)
People from Minot, Maine
Businesspeople from Washington, D.C.